Kyra Giorgi (born 1977) is an Australian author and historian.

Early life and career 
Kyra Giorgi was born in Perth Western Australia—her mother is the novelist Gail Jones. Giorgi took her PhD in history from La Trobe University in 2012 with the thesis - Saudade, lítost, hüzün: cultural identity and melancholic fatalism on the margins of Europe. 

The Circle and the Equator was her first book of fiction, and was Highly Commended in the inaugural Dorothy Hewett Award for an Unpublished Manuscript.

Awards 
At the 2017 Queensland Literary Awards, her work The Circle and the Equator won the University of Southern Queensland Australian Short Story Collection - Steele Rudd Award.

Works

References

External links
 Official website

1977 births
Living people
Australian writers